Idol 2015 is the eleventh season of the Swedish Idol series and began on 17 August 2015. This was the last season with the current jury which consists of Laila Bagge, Anders Bagge and Alexander Bard. Martin Almgren won the competition Amanda Winberg became the Runner-Up and Simon Zion came  Third.

Contestants
Anna Sofia Monroy, 16 - Eliminated 4th
Adam Torsell, 25 - Eliminated 2nd
Amanda Winberg, 19 - Runner-Up
Axel Schylström, 23 - 4th Place
Bori Shoyebo, 16 - Eliminated 5th
Frans Walfridsson, 17 - Eliminated 7th
Ida Da Silva, 20 - Eliminated 6th
Lina Ryden, 21 - Eliminated 1st
Martin Almgren, 27 - Winner
Magnus Englund, 20 - Eliminated 3rd
Simon Zion, 26 - 3rd Place
Tove Burman, 16 - Eliminated 8th

Elimination Chart 
The diagram shows how each participant placed during the qualifying week and the weekly finals.

References

Idol (Swedish TV series)
2015 in Swedish music
2015 Swedish television seasons